Cimpor - Cimentos de Portugal is the largest Portuguese cement group, operating in eleven countries - Portugal, Spain, Morocco, Brazil, Tunisia, Turkey, Cape Verde, Mozambique, China, Egypt and South Africa, involved in manufacturing and marketing cement, hydraulic lime, concrete and aggregates, precast concrete and dry mortars. The Brazilian company Camargo Corrêa is the owner of the company.

In Portugal, Cimpor has major factories in Coimbra (Souselas), Vila Franca de Xira (Alhandra), Loulé and Figueira da Foz (Cabo Mondego).

Cimpor is listed on the Euronext Lisbon stock exchange and is a member of the benchmark PSI-20 index. The company was owned by two Brazilian conglomerates which built up stakes in February 2010 in order to thwart a €3.9 billion takeover bid from  steel maker Companhia Siderúrgica Nacional (CSN): Camargo Corrêa holds 32.9% and the Votorantim Group 21.2% (of which 17.3% was purchased from Lafarge and 3.7% from Cinveste). A 9.6% stake in Cimpor held by the bank Caixa Geral de Depósitos is also imputable to Votorantim due to an agreement between the parties. In 2012 with the purchase of additional shares and the exchange of certain assets to the Votorantim Group, Camargo Corrêa through its subsidiary InterCement now holds 94.8% stake in Cimpor and becomes its sole shareholder, with the remaining shares being traded on Euronext Lisbon.

On 21 June 2017, Cimpor's shareholders voted for Camargo Corrêa (owner of 95,1% of total shares) to acquire all of Cimpor's public shares in a move to remove the company from the Lisbon stock exchange.

References

External links

Mover Participações
Cement companies of Portugal
Companies based in Lisbon
Manufacturing companies established in 1976
Portuguese brands
Portuguese companies established in 1976